Vexillum brevior is an extinct species of sea snail, a marine gastropod mollusk, in the family Costellariidae, the ribbed miters.

Distribution
Fossils of this marine species were found in Miocene strata in Poland and Slovakia.

References

 MolluscaBase eds. (2023). MolluscaBase. Vexillum brevior (Friedberg, 1911) †. Accessed through: World Register of Marine Species at: https://www.marinespecies.org/aphia.php?p=taxdetails&id=1473080 on 2023-03-14
 Biskupič R. (2020). A new evidence of Vexillum (Gastropoda: Costellariidae) from the middle Miocene (Serravallian) of the Vienna Basin (Slovakia). Acta Geologica Slovaca. 12(2): 75-88

brevior
Gastropods described in 1911